Union Theological Seminary in the City of New York (UTS) is a private ecumenical Christian liberal seminary in Morningside Heights, Manhattan, affiliated with neighboring Columbia University. Since 1928, the seminary has served as Columbia's constituent faculty of theology. In 1964, UTS also established an affiliation with the neighboring Jewish Theological Seminary of America.

UTS is the oldest independent seminary in the United States and has long been known as a bastion of progressive Christian scholarship, with a number of prominent thinkers among its faculty or alumni. It was founded in 1836 by members of the Presbyterian Church in the USA, but was open to students of all denominations. In 1893, UTS rescinded the right of the General Assembly of the Presbyterian Church to veto faculty appointments, thus becoming fully independent. In the 20th century, Union became a center of liberal Christianity. It served as the birthplace of the Black theology, womanist theology, and other theological movements. It houses the Burke Library at Union Theological Seminary, one of the largest theological libraries in the Western Hemisphere.

History

Early history

Union Theological Seminary was founded in 1836. During the late 19th century it became one of the leading centers of liberal Christianity in the United States. In 1891, Charles A. Briggs, who was being installed as the chair of biblical studies, delivered an inaugural address in which he questioned the verbal inspiration of Scripture. When the General Assembly of the Presbyterian Church in the U.S.A. vetoed Briggs' appointment and eventually deposed Briggs for heresy two years later, Union removed itself from denominational oversight. In 1939 the Auburn Theological Seminary moved to its campus and departed in 2014.

Among its graduates were the historian of Christianity Arthur McGiffert; biblical scholar James Moffatt; Harry Emerson Fosdick, the pastor of Riverside Church who served as professor during his tenure there; and the Socialist leader Norman Thomas.

Union Settlement

In 1895, members of the Union Theological Seminary Alumni Club founded Union Settlement Association, one of the oldest settlement houses in New York City. After visiting Toynbee Hall in London and inspired by the example of Hull House in Chicago, the alumni decided to create a settlement house in the area of Manhattan enclosed on the north and south by East 96th and 110th Streets and on the east and west by the East River and Central Park.

The neighborhood, known as East Harlem, was filled with new tenements but devoid of any civic services. The ethos of the settlement house movement called for its workers to "settle" in such neighborhoods in order to learn first-hand the problems of the residents. “It seemed to us that, as early settlers, we had a chance to grow up with the community and affect its development,” wrote William Adams Brown, Theology Professor, Union Theological Society (1892–1930) and President, Union Settlement Association (1915–1919).

Union Settlement still exists, providing community-based services and programs to support the immigrant and low-income residents of East Harlem. One of East Harlem's largest social service agencies, Union Settlement reaches more than 13,000 people annually at 17 locations throughout East Harlem through a range of programs, including early childhood education, youth development, senior services, job training, the arts, adult education, nutrition, counseling, a farmers' market, community development, and neighborhood cultural events.

20th century to present
Reinhold Niebuhr and Paul Tillich made UTS the center of both liberal and neo-orthodox Protestantism in the inter-war period. Niebuhr joined UTS in 1929 and Tillich in 1933. Prominent public intellectual Cornel West commenced a promising academic career at UTS in 1977. As liberalism lost ground to conservatism after the 1960s (while neo-orthodoxy dissipated) and thus declined in prestige, UTS ran into financial difficulties and shrank significantly because of a reduced student base.

Eventually, the school agreed to lease some of its buildings to Columbia University and to transfer ownership of and responsibility for the Burke Library to Columbia. These agreements helped stabilize the school's finances, which had been hobbled by increasing library costs and the need for substantial campus repairs.

On July 1, 2008, feminist theologian Serene Jones became Union's first female president in its 172-year history, succeeding Joseph C. Hough, Jr.

On June 10, 2014, Jones announced that the Seminary would be joining the movement to divest from the fossil fuels industry in protest at the damage the industry is causing to the environment. The Seminary's $108 million endowment will no longer include any fossil fuel investments.

Although administratively independent from Columbia, Union is represented by one voting faculty member, and one non-voting student observer member, of the Columbia University Senate.

Campus

Union's campus is located in the Morningside Heights neighborhood of Manhattan, New York City, bordered by Claremont Avenue, Broadway, and West 120th and 122nd Streets. The brick and limestone English Gothic revival architecture, by architects Allen & Collens, completed in 1910, includes the tower, which adapts features of the crossing tower of Durham Cathedral. Adjacent to Teachers College, Barnard College, the Jewish Theological Seminary of America, and the Manhattan School of Music, Union has cross-registration and library access agreements with all of these schools.

The building was added to the National Register of Historic Places on April 23, 1980, and parts were made a New York City designated landmark in 1965. Some sections of the campus are now on long-term lease to Columbia University.

Library

The Burke Library at Union Theological Seminary, one of the largest theological libraries in North America, contains holdings of over 700,000 items. The Burke's holdings include extensive special collections, including Greek census records from 20 CE, a rare 12th-century manuscript of the Life of St. Boniface, and one of the first African-American hymnals, published in Philadelphia in 1818.

The Burke Library also maintains a number of world-renowned archival collections, including the Archives of Women in Theological Scholarship and the Missionary Research Library Archives.

In 2004 Union's Burke Library became fully integrated into the Columbia University Libraries system, which holds over 14 million volumes. The library is named in honor of Walter Burke, a generous benefactor to the library who served as Chairman of the Board of Directors of the Seminary from 1976 to 1982.

Faculty

Both Reinhold Niebuhr and Paul Tillich taught at the seminary. Nieburhr joined the faculty in 1929 and retired in 1952. Tillich was recruited by Niebuhr to UTS following his dismissal from the University of Frankfurt. Nazi officials terminated Tillich from the University of Frankfurt and placed him on their list of "undesirables". Tillich subsequently narrowly escaped arrest by the Gestapo in October 1933 and made his way out of Germany joining UTS in December, 1933.

In 1930, Dietrich Bonhoeffer was a Postgraduate Teaching Fellow at the seminary. He later returned in 1939 to be a member of the faculty and to escape Nazi harassment in Germany. Writing of his experience there in his book Barcelona, Berlin, New York, Bonhoeffer was dismayed by the liberalism of the seminary and its students, noting, "The students are completely clueless with respect to what dogmatics is really about. They are not familiar with even the most basic questions. They become intoxicated with liberal and humanistic phrases, are amused at the fundamentalists, and yet basically are not even up to their level...." Referring to Union Seminary, Bonhoeffer noted: "A seminary in which numerous students openly laugh during a public lecture because they find it amusing when a passage on sin and forgiveness ...is cited has obviously, despite its many advantages, forgotten what Christian theology in its very essence stands for" (pp. 309–10). He soon regretted his decision and decided that he had to return to Germany to resist the Nazis. He took the last ship from New York to Germany in late August 1939. Due to his secret involvement with the 20 July plot on Hitler's life, he was executed at the Flossenbürg concentration camp on April 8, 1945, only 15 days before the United States Army liberated the camp.

American theologian, James Hal Cone, one of the founders of liberation theology and influential in the development of Black theology, began teaching at Union Theological Seminary in New York City in 1970, holding the distinguished Charles A. Briggs Chair in systematic theology from 1977 until his death in 2018.

Serene Jones, the seminary's first female president, was inaugurated in November 2008. replacing Joseph Hough, UTS' immediate past president. Civil rights activist Cornel West joined the faculty in July 2012, and rejoined again in 2021.

Notable current faculty
 Mary C. Boys – Skinner and McAlpin Professor of Practical Theology
 David M. Carr – Professor of Old Testament; contributed to Genesis in the New Oxford Annotated Bible (New Revised Standard Version)
 Euan Cameron – Henry Luce, III Professor of Reformation Church History
 Alan Cooper – Appointed Professor of Bible in 1998, becoming the first person to hold a joint professorship at both Union and the Jewish Theological Seminary of America. His dual appointment has been described as a major step in strengthening ties between the two seminaries.
 Pamela Cooper-White – Christiane Brooks Johnson Professor of Psychology and Religion
 Kelly Brown Douglas – Dean of the Episcopal Divinity School at Union Theological Seminary as well as the Canon Theologian at the Washington National Cathedral. 
 Gary Dorrien – American social ethicist and theologian, Reinhold Niebuhr Professor of Social Ethics
 Roger Haight – Visiting Professor of Theology
 Esther J. Hamori - Professor of Hebrew Bible
 Brigitte Kahl – Professor of New Testament
 Chung Hyun Kyung – Associate Professor of Ecumenical Theology
 Aliou C. Niang - Associate Professor of New Testament
 Jerusha T. Rhodes - Associate Professor of Islam and Interreligious Engagement
 Kosen Greg Snyder - Senior Director and Assistant Professor of Buddhist Studies
 John J. Thatamanil – Professor of Theology and World Religions
 Cornel West – Professor of Religious Philosophy and Christian Practice
 Andrea C. White – Associate Professor of Theology and Culture
 Jason Wright – Board of Trustees member

Several of Union's members also teach in the Religious Studies department at Columbia University, the Teachers College, Columbia University, New York Theological Seminary, and the Jewish Theological Seminary of America.

Notable former faculty
 Michelle Alexander – writer, civil rights advocate, author of The New Jim Crow: Mass Incarceration in the Age of Colorblindness, opinion columnist for The New York Times. Visiting professor from 2016 to 2021. 
 Charles Augustus Briggs – Professor of Hebrew and Cognate Languages (1874–1891) and of Biblical Theology (1891–1904); an important early leader of the Modernist movement
 Raymond E. Brown (1928–1998) – Professor of New Testament (1971-1990), member of the Pontifical Bible Commission, and the first Catholic to gain tenure
 Charles Butler (1802–1897) – founder
 Henry Sloane Coffin – President of Union and a leading theological liberal. Coffin also obtained his Bachelor of Divinity from the Union Theological Seminary in 1900. He declined an offer to become president of Union Theological Seminary in 1916. In 1926, offered the presidency (a second time), he accepted and retained the post until 1945.
 James Cone (1936-2018) – a founder of Black theology, he was Charles Augustus Briggs Distinguished Professor of Systematic Theology until his death
 W. D. Davies, (1911–2001), Welsh-born Edward Robinson Professor of Biblical Theology, noted New Testament scholar and Congregationalist Minister.
 Harrison S. Elliot (1882–1951) – author and leader in the Y.M.C.A., Religious Education Association, and Union Theological Seminary.
 James A. Forbes, Joe R. Engle Professor of Preaching before becoming senior pastor of Riverside Church, after which he continued to serve as an adjunct professor. 
 Harry Emerson Fosdick – First minister of Riverside Church and professor of homiletics
Beverly Wildung Harrison - a Christian feminist ethicist, she taught for 34 years at Union and was the Caroline Williams Beaird Professor of Ethics. She was the first woman president of the North American Society of Christian Ethics.
 Paul F. Knitter – Paul Tillich Professor of Theology
 John Macquarrie – Professor of Systematic Theology (1962–70), afterwards Lady Margaret Professor of Divinity in the University of Oxford and Canon Residentiary of Christ Church, Oxford (1970–1986)
 John Anthony McGuckin  – Nielsen Professor of Early and Byzantine Church History, President of the Sophia Institute, Archpriest of the Orthodox Church
 Christopher Morse – Dietrich Bonhoeffer Professor of Theology & Ethics
 J. Brooke Mosley, president
 Reinhold Niebuhr (1892–1971) – Professor of Applied Christianity – Christian social ethics, author of the influential The Nature and Destiny of Man (1941), and the Serenity Prayer (popularized through the Twelve-step program)
 Peter C. Phan – the inaugural holder of the Ellacuria Chair of Catholic Social Thought at Georgetown University
 Robert Pollack – professor of Science and Religion
 Edward Robinson – Biblical scholar and discoverer of Robinson's Arch and Hezekiah's Tunnel in Jerusalem
 Philip Schaff (1819–1893) – Theologian and ecclesiastical historian who served as chair of theological encyclopedia and Christian symbolism, then as chair of Hebrew and the cognate languages, followed by chair of sacred literature, and finally chair of church history until his death in 1893.
 William Greenough Thayer Shedd — Professor of Sacred Literature (1863–1874) and of Systematic Theology (1874–1890)
 Dorothee Soelle – Socially engaged German theologian
 Paul Tillich (1886–1965) – German-American theologian and Christian existentialist philosopher
 Phyllis Trible (b. 1932) – served as a Visiting Professor of Old Testament
 Ann Belford Ulanov – Christiane Brooks Johnson Memorial Professor of Psychiatry and Religion
 Harry F. Ward – chairman of the ACLU and Professor of Ethics
 Delores S. Williams earned her PhD from Union Theological Seminary, and later became the Paul Tillich Professor of Feminist Theology at Union Theological Seminary Her title was later changed to the Paul Tillich Professor of Theology and Culture. Following retirement, she became Professor Emerita. 
 Walter Wink – Biblical scholar and activist

Notable alumni

 Rubem Alves – Brazilian theologian and writer
 William Scott Ament (Bachelor of Divinity, 1877) – controversial American missionary to China (1877–1909)
 John Batchelor – radio news show writer and host
 Frederic Mayer Bird – Class of 1860: clergyman, educator, and hymnologist.
 J. Seelye Bixler – 16th president of Colby College
 Dietrich Bonhoeffer – German Lutheran theologian and Nazi resister, attended UTS in 1930 for postgraduate studies and a teaching fellowship under Reinhold Niebuhr 
 Anton Boisen – founder of Clinical Pastoral Education (CPE) movement
 Marcus Borg – Biblical scholar and author; former Hundere Distinguished Professor of Religion and Culture at Oregon State University
 V.C. Samuel – Indian Christian theologian, philosopher and historian
 Malcolm Boyd – Episcopal priest and author. He was one of the most prominent of the gay clergy to come out of the closet when he did so in 1977. For two years in 1956 and 1957, Boyd engaged in post-graduate studies at Union Theological Seminary where he wrote his first book, Crisis in Communication. He participated in the civil rights and anti-Vietnam War movements in the 1960s.
 Frederick Buechner – writer, novelist, poet, essayist, theologian, and ordained Presbyterian minister. Buechner described his time at Union at length in his 1982 autobiographical work, The Sacred Journey. In 2008 Union honored Buechner with the Unitas Distinguished Alumni/ae Awards, bestowed upon alumni/ae who exemplify the Seminary’s academic breadth, diversity, and inclusiveness.
 Frederick Buckley Newell (Bachelor of Divinity, 1916) – Bishop of The Methodist Church
 Edwin Otway Burnham (Bachelor of Divinity, 1855) – a rifle shooting Congregational missionary in Sioux Indian territory who could bark a squirrel, swing an axe or dispense Gospel with equal fervor and efficiency.
 David Budbill – poet
 Walter Brueggemann – William Marcellus McPheeters professor of Old Testament at Columbia Theological Seminary
 W. Sterling Cary (BD 1952) – president of the National Council of Churches from 1972 to 1975
 Gladwyn M. Childs – anthropologist and missionary
 Grigor Cilka – reverend, missionary, teacher and founder of first Protestant parish in Korçë, Albania
 Joseph Gallup Cochran (class of 1847) – reverend, Presbyterian missionary, teacher
 Oliver Crane (1848), Presbyterian clergy, missionary, Oriental scholar, writer
 Nelson Cruikshank (Master of divinity, 1929) – labor union activist and strategist responsible for the passage of Medicare
 David Dellinger – noted American peace activist and member of the Chicago Seven
 Lynn de Silva (Master of Sacred Theology) – Sri Lankan theologian, former director of the Ecumenical Institute for Study and Dialogue, Methodist minister, and a pioneer in promoting Buddhist–Christian dialogue
 John R. Everett (B.D. 1944) – President of Hollins College, first Chancellor of the Municipal College System of the City of New York, and President of the New School for Social Research
 Helen Flanders Dunbar (B.D. 1927) – early figure in U.S. psychosomatic medicine
 Franklin I. Gamwell – Shailer Mathews Professor of Religious Ethics, the Philosophy of Religion, and Theology at the Divinity School of the University of Chicago
 Francis L. Garrett – Chief of Chaplains of the U.S. Navy
 Beverly Roberts Gaventa – New Testament exegete, theologian, and author most recently of When in Romans
 J. T. Gulick, evolutionary biologist
 Susan E. Goff, suffragan bishop of the Episcopal Diocese of Virginia
 David P. Gushee – Distinguished University Professor of Christian Ethics at Mercer University. Author of 9 books and over 70 articles
 Douglas John Hall – emeritus professor of theology at McGill University, and theologian of the cross.
 Mark Hanson – former Presiding Bishop of the Evangelical Lutheran Church in America.
 Edler Garnet Hawkins – former Moderator of the General Assembly for the United Presbyterian Church in the United States of America.
 Carter Heyward – lesbian feminist theologian and priest in the Episcopal Church
 Richard Holloway – Scottish writer and broadcaster and was formerly Bishop of Edinburgh
 Dwight Hopkins – Professor of Theology at the Divinity School at the University of Chicago
 Myles Horton – co-founder of the Highlander Center
 William H. Hudnut III – former Mayor of Indianapolis, Indiana (1976–1992)
 Ada Maria Isasi-Diaz – Professor of Ethics and Theology at Drew University
 Suzan Johnson Cook – former presidential advisor and United States Ambassador-at-Large for International Religious Freedom (2011–2013)
 Mark Juergensmeyer – Professor of Sociology, Religious Studies, and Global Studies at the University of California at Santa Barbara and Director of the Orfalea Center for Global and International Studies
 Norman J. Kansfield – President New Brunswick Theological Seminary 1993–2005 and Senior Scholar in Residence, Theological School, Drew University
 Mineo Katagiri – Minister and social activist
 James Franklin Kay – Professor of Homiletics and Liturgics at Princeton Theological Seminary
 George R. Lunn – Mayor of Schenectady, New York, Member of the United States House of Representatives, Lieutenant Governor of New York
 Ernest Lyon (1860-1938)  –  Minister, former United States Ambassador to Liberia, and founder of the Maryland Industrial and Agricultural Institute for Colored Youths.
 Reuben H. Markhammissionary educator to Bulgaria; journalist, Christian Science Monitor; author of numerous books
 Rollo May – existential psychologist
 Rachel Kollock McDowell – religion editor of the New York Times (1920–1948)
 Andrew McLellan – former Moderator of the General Assembly of the Church of Scotland
 James David Manning – pastor in Harlem
 Bruce McLeod (PhD) – Moderator of the United Church of Canada
 William P. Merrill – first president on the Church Peace Union, writer of "Rise Up, O Men of God"
 Henry F. C. Nichols – member of the Wisconsin State Assembly
 Lisa Oz – author and radio and television personality 
Eunice Blanchard Poethig (PhD, 1985) – minister, Presbyterian Church (USA) leader and educator
 Paul Raushenbush – American Baptist minister and Religion Editor for The Huffington Post
 John Bunyan Reeve – first Black student, organized theology department at Howard University
 Scott Rennie – minister of the Church of Scotland at Queen's Cross Church, Aberdeen
 James Herman Robinson (1938) – founder of Operation Crossroads Africa, a forerunner of the Peace Corps
 Carl Rogers – pioneering psychologist
 Leroy S. Rouner - Professor of Philosophy, Religion, and Philosophical Theology at Boston University
 Fleming Rutledge - Episcopal priest and author
 E. P. Sanders – a principal founder of the New Perspective on Paul movement
 Nathan A. Scott, Jr. – scholar of religion and literature
 Henry Sloane Coffin – President of Union Theological Seminary
 William Gayley Simpson – former associate director of the National Civil Liberties Bureau (American Civil Liberties Union)
 Andrea Smith – Indigenous intellectual and anti-violence activist
 John Sung – a Chinese Christian evangelist who played an instrumental role in the revival movement among the Chinese in Mainland China, Taiwan, and Southeast Asia during the 1920s and 1930s
 John Stoltenberg – feminist writer
 Juhanon Mar Thoma – Metropolitan of Marthoma Syrian Church in India
 Norman Thomas – socialist
Conrad Tillard (born 1964) - Baptist minister, radio host, author, civil rights activist, and politician
 K. H. Ting – President emeritus of the Three-Self Patriotic Movement and China Christian Council
Constance Cochnower Virtue - composer who developed the Virtue Notagraph
 Raphael Warnock – U.S. Senator from Georgia (2021-) and senior pastor at Ebenezer Baptist Church in Atlanta
 George W. Webber (1920–2010) – President of the New York Theological Seminary
 Floyd Wilcox – third president of Shimer College
 Walter Wink – Biblical scholar and activist

See also
 Union Seminary Quarterly Review

References

Further reading
 Altman, Jake. Socialism Before Sanders: The 1930s Movement from Romance to Revisionism. New York: Palgrave Macmillan, 2019.
 Handy, Robert T. A History of Union Theological Seminary in New York. New York: Columbia University Press, 1987.

External links

 

 
Columbia University
Educational institutions established in 1836
School buildings on the National Register of Historic Places in Manhattan
Presbyterian universities and colleges in the United States
Seminaries and theological colleges in New York City
Universities and colleges in New York City
Upper West Side
Morningside Heights, Manhattan
Education in Harlem
1836 establishments in New York (state)
New York City Designated Landmarks in Manhattan